Horst Kohle (born 7 October 1935) is a former East German footballer.

External Links

References 

1935 births
Living people
East Germany international footballers
1. FC Frankfurt players
East German footballers
Association football forwards